Hungary competed at the 2019 World Championships in Athletics in Doha, Qatar, from 27 September to 6 October 2019. Hungary was represented by 17 athletes.

Medalists

Results

Men
Track and road events

Field events

Women 
Track and road events

Field events

References

Hungary IAAF World Athletics Championships, DOHA 2019. IAAF. Retrieved 2019-09-29.

Nations at the 2019 World Athletics Championships
World Championships in Athletics
2019